Supernoobs is a Canadian animated comedy television series produced by DHX Media (now known as WildBrain) for Cartoon Network and Teletoon. The series is about four kids who navigate through middle school and fight evil assassins at the same time. It first premiered on Cartoon Network in the United Kingdom and Ireland on November 2, 2015. Supernoobs was created by Scott Fellows, who also created Johnny Test, Ned's Declassified School Survival Guide, Big Time Rush, and 100 Things to Do Before High School.

On January 11, 2018, DHX announced that the second season would air on its Family Channel instead of Teletoon. The second season has been picked up by Cartoon Network across Europe, the Middle East and Africa, and Hulu and YouTube in the United States. The show ended on February 7, 2019.

Premise
12-year-old nerdy best friends Tyler, Kevin, Shope, and the Roach not only need to contend with the harrowing halls of their Canadian middle school, but must survive microcosmic assassins infecting earthlings bent on destroying them and the entire world.

Characters

The Supernoobs
Four middle school students from the town of Cornbury unexpectedly find themselves gifted with alien orb-like weapons known as Battle Balls that grant them amazing powers. However, when the Supernoobs aren't fighting the virus, they tend to use their powers irresponsibly and/or end up losing their Battle Balls which lead them into crazy disasters.
 Tyler Bowman (voiced by Matt Hill) – The wielder of the blue battle ball, which gives him the power to teleport and enhances his natural senses, giving him abilities such as mind-reading. It transforms his blonde hair to blue. Tyler is the group's leader and often moral compass, but is also distracted by his feelings for fellow student Amy Anderson. After his battle ball was damaged due to paint corrosion, he and the noobs go to the Ball Master to have them repaired. Not only did she restore his old powers but he also gained the power of telekinesis as well.
 Kevin Reynolds (voiced by Richard Cox) – The wielder of the red battle ball, which enables him to shapeshift into various animals. A running gag involves Kevin turning into an opossum or something other than what he intended to turn into. The battle ball transforms his black hair to red. Kevin is the most selfish and irresponsible member of the team, often employing his Battle Ball for his own amusement and personal gain or making suggestions that get the group into trouble. After his battle ball becomes damaged due to paint corrosion, he and the noobs go to the Ball Master to have them repaired. Not only did she restore his old powers but he also gained the ability to transform into Virus versions of animals. Kevin is also implied to have feelings for Shope as he stated under mind control; he hoped to one day "marry" Shope.
 Jennifer Shope (voiced by Tabitha St. Germain) – The most scientifically minded of the group, who also considers herself to be the smartest but she sometimes relies on her friends to do some of her work so she could get her "Easy A". Shope wields the purple battle ball, which allows her to harness the natural forces around her like water and electricity. It transforms her black hair to purple. She is commonly known by her surname "Shope" to her friends, whereas most adults refer to her by her given name Jennifer. After her battle ball was damaged due to paint corrosion, she and the noobs go to the Ball Master to have them repaired. Not only did she restore her old powers but she also gained the ability to manipulate subatomic frequencies.
 Theodore "Roach/The Roach" Roachmont (voiced by Lee Tockar) – The shortest member of the Supernoobs with unruly red hair in which various objects can be found in. Roach wields the green battle ball, which grants him the power of flight and super strength by enlarging his fists. It transforms his red hair to green. He is shown to be the most innocent and least selfish member of the noobs although he can be the most clueless and gullible member as well.  Though not usually the team's strategist, he does occasionally stumble onto brilliant ideas, such as discovering that the Battle Balls could combine to create a vehicle. He also tends to develop crushes on mature female characters, such as XR4Ti, the Noobs' theater teacher, and an alien princess. After his battle ball was damaged due to paint corrosion, he and the noobs go to the Ball Master to have them repaired. Not only did she restore his old powers but he also gained the ability to remove his own arms.

Civilians
 Jock Jockerson (voiced by Michael Adamthwaite) – A 8th grader of the Noobs' school noted for his large size and athletic ability, Jock is a bully who often refers to himself in the third person. He is not highly intelligent, quick to anger, and often ends up in his underwear as a result of the Noobs' misadventures.
 Principal Warmerammer (voiced by Maryke Hendrikse) – The stern administrator of the Noobs' school who is suspicious of their activities.
 Amy Anderson (voiced by Maryke Hendrikse) – A classmate of the Noobs whom Tyler has a crush on, though he lacks confidence in approaching/speaking to her. Despite this, she seems to reciprocate his feelings to some degree, and unwittingly develops a crush on his superhero alter ego after he saves her from a Virus attack.
 Sue Newswoman (voiced by Tabitha St. Germain) – A newscaster who often covers stories of the Noobs' misadventures.
 Mr. and Mrs. Shope (voiced by Doron Bell and Kathleen Barr) – Jennifer Shope's mild-mannered parents, who are somewhat skeptical of her friendship with the other Noobs. Due to being unaware of their daughter's superhero status, they become fearful that the boys are having a negative influence on her due to her displaying uncharacteristic behaviour and once threatened to send her to a boarding school if she continued to display such behaviour. Fortunately, Zen-disguised as Jennifer -manages to convince them to trust in her judgment and ability to stay on top of things, though they remain strict. Mem later impersonated Mr. Shope at Jennifer's parent-teacher conference, as the Noobs' evil-fighting activities had affected their schoolwork and they didn't want their real parents to know.
 Mrs. Bowman – Tyler's mother whom he greatly resembles; Tyler's father has not been seen or mentioned, possibly indicating that she is divorced or a widow.
 Mr. and Mrs. Roachmont – The Roach's parents, who appear to be fairly well-to-do based on their home and usual clothing. Mr. Roachmont is a large man with brown hair who often wears a suit, while Mrs. Roachmont is a shapely blond-haired woman who was first seen in a red dress. The two are both apparently afraid of mice, as Kevin once scared them out of their home by taking the form of a mouse.
 Coach Huntz (voiced by Lee Tockar) – the gym teacher and coach of the football team at Cornbury Middle School, known for yelling and blowing his whistle.
 Emmas – Three little girls who witness the Noobs fighting evil in civilian form and threaten to expose them unless they concede to all of their demands. They later relent after the Noobs save them from a virus-infected eagle.

Benevolent Alliance
An intergalactic organization dedicated to battling the virus and bringing the people responsible for creating the virus to justice.

 Zenblock/Zen (voiced by Michael Adamthwaite) – A blue dragon-like alien who is constantly accompanied by Mem, whom he is virtually identical to physically apart from their colouring, teeth, and nose shape. Zen is the gruffer of the pair, but like Mem is largely unfamiliar with Earth culture and can be as immature and childish as Mem on occasion. They were sent to Earth by the Benevolent Alliance to recruit warriors for the battle against the virus, but mistook the four children in mismatched football gear and armed with slingshots for soldiers. While he is often disparaging of the Noobs' skills, he does have a soft spot for them, which led to him being assigned along with Mem to train the group. He is also shown to have a strained sibling-like friendship with Mem as he and Mem often disagree and blame each other on many things although they do many activities together and have some similar interests. He is also shown to have a sleepwalking problem, which he calls "sleepfighting". Zen often speaks with an Austrian accent similar to Arnold Schwarzenegger and is capable of disguising himself as an adult male human, during which he employs the alias "Rob".
 Memnock/Mem (voiced by Bill Mondy) – A greenish-yellow dragon-like alien and companion to Zen, who like Zen, also possesses special armor that grants him similar powers to the Noobs. Mem is the softer spoken and more sensitive of the pair but like Zen, he is often annoyed and embarrassed by the irresponsible shenanigans of the Noobs and sometimes falls victim to them. Despite being a virus warrior, Mem is often shown as the most immature and childish member of the duo as his willingness to understand Earth culture often distracts him from taking care of the noobs. Mem and Zen are shown to have a friendship that is similar to that of brothers as they have the tendency to blame each other for things, such as the mistake of selecting the Supernoobs, though they usually come to their aid during battles. He is also shown to like cooking food as a hobby, and is capable of disguising himself as an adult male human, during which he employs the alias "Bob".
 XR4Ti (voiced by Rebecca Shoichet) – The feminine artificial intelligence who controls Mem and Zen's ship, the Galacticus. XR4Ti is often the voice of reason, even more so than the occasionally irresponsible and immature Mem and Zen, but deals with limitations of being a computer with no power to act on her own. Because of her role as a voice of reason, XR4Ti has a stern mother-child like relationship with both Mem and Zen and the noobs although she is unaware of Roach's crush on her.
 General Blorgon (voiced by Scott McNeil) – The leader of the Benevolent Alliance, a blue-skinned and bald humanoid alien with telepathic abilities. Blorgon is Mem and Zen's superior, and usually appears with two aides or colleagues who assist him in his duties. Though noble, Blorgon is known for his harsh methods, such as subjecting new virus warrior recruits to harsh tests or punishing those irresponsible enough to misplace their battle balls by having their brains sucked out (though the latter is only implied).
 Secretary Hedies (voiced by Maryke Hendrikse) – One of the Elders of the Benevolent Alliance.
 Secretary Techn'ut (voiced by Lee Tockar) – One of the Elders of the Benevolent Alliance.
 Rovu – An reddish-brown dragon-like alien who appears to be of the same or a similar species to Mem and Zen. Like Mem and Zen, Rovu is assigned to recruit warriors to battle the Virus, but has been much more successful than them and won the Recruiter of the Year award seven times in a row. He is highly egotistical and enjoys rubbing his success in the faces of others, especially Mem and Zen, who are occasionally bullied by him every so often.  He was humbled when the Supernoobs rescued the entire New Virus Warriors convention from Count Venamus, resulting in Mem and Zen receiving the Recruiter of the Year award and breaking his streak.
 Chiquadotran/Dot - A small, pink dragon-like alien who is a legendary and famous virus warrior. She appears to be of the same or similar species to Mem and Zen. She was known for creating a powerful technique called the supernova.  She also recruited and trained Mem and Zen when they were at young.

Villains
 Virus – It comes from outer space and infects different planets. Its purpose is to infect any living organism and turn them into rampaging monsters to wreak havoc. The Benevolent Alliance and the Supernoobs battle the Virus and also seek to find out who created it.
 Count Venamus (voiced by Trevor Devall) – A blue tusked octopus-like alien that is one of the creators' agents and he's a wanted criminal throughout the galaxy. His job is to infect the warriors that are battling the virus. The Benevolent alliance and the Supernoobs are trying to capture him in hopes that he'll have the information about the creators of the virus. Until his first encounter with the Supernoobs his invisibility power/technology had made him a mysterious figure whose very existence was uncertain; however, the Noobs manage to thwart his plan and his identity now exposed, leading him to swear vengeance. He has engaged the Noobs on several occasions since, but is usually defeated through the Noobs' quick-thinking and/or dumb luck.
 Venaminions - Bestial creatures in service to Count Venamus; they are strong but seem to rely on Venamus' leadership to function at any level of competence.
 The Creators of the Virus – Very little about the creators is known only that they created the virus and unleashed it throughout the universe. They have agents like Count Venamus to help infect the universe.  One such creator is revealed to have six glaring red eyes and speaks in a language only Venamus understands
 Mr. Wertz (voiced by Michael Adamthwaite) – Formerly a science teacher at the Noobs' school, Mr. Wertz suffers from paranoia and megalomania, having believed in the existence of aliens before he ever encountered Mem and Zen and learned of the Noobs' powers. Upon learning of these he attempted to expose them, but without proof was dismissed as insane.  He later tries to enslave all of Cornbury by inventing goggles that allow him to use mind control on those who wear it but Shope manages to stop him. He got hold of the virus and tries to use it to take over the world; however, he was defeated by the Noobs and was taken back to the School Board.
 The Incredibly Amazing Man (voiced by Andrew Francis) – A galactic "superhero" who fights the virus and is more competent than the Noobs but proves incredibly destructive in the process; he refuses to acknowledge this fact due to his highly arrogant, narcissistic, and egotistical personality. He possesses various abilities such as flight, laser vision, super strength, and elongation. He is also obsessed with selling his merchandise to his fans, and says "you're welcome" quite often, even when it makes absolutely no sense.

Episodes

Season 1 (2015–17)

Season 2 (2018–19)
DHX Media announced a second season of the series. The series moved to the Family channel in Canada and is available for streaming on Hulu in the United States.

Broadcast
Supernoobs first premiered on Cartoon Network in the United Kingdom and Ireland on November 2, 2015. The series premiered on Cartoon Network in the United States on December 7, 2015, the Middle East and Africa on January 18, 2016, and in Russia, Bulgaria, Australia and New Zealand on February 1, 2016. In Turkey and Central & Eastern Europe the series debuted on February 8, 2016., In Southeast Asia the series is first premiered in the Philippines on February 1, 2016, and the rest of the Asian countries is premiered on June 6, 2016.  The entire first season became available on iTunes on July 12, 2016 and includes episodes that have yet to air. Four episodes debuted on Teletoon in Canada on September 20, 2016.

Reception

Ratings 
The premiere of the series in the U.S. attracted 818,000 viewers.

Critical reception 
Jaclyn Appelgate from Comic Book Resources described the animation as "decent enough", although going on to state "that's just about the only decent part of the show. The characters are unlikable, the voice acting is downright embarrassing, and the storylines are so ridiculous you will feel as though you're losing brain cells watching a single episode." Emily Ashby from Common Sense Media gave the show two out of five stars, stating "As superhero stories go, this offbeat show misses the mark".

References

External links
 
  at Cartoon Network

2015 Canadian television series debuts
2019 Canadian television series endings
2010s Canadian animated television series
2010s Canadian children's television series
2010s Canadian comic science fiction television series
Canadian children's animated action television series
Canadian children's animated space adventure television series
Canadian children's animated comic science fiction television series
Canadian children's animated science fantasy television series
Canadian children's animated superhero television series
Canadian flash animated television series
English-language television shows
Teletoon original programming
Family Channel (Canadian TV network) original programming
Television series by DHX Media
Television series created by Scott Fellows
Animated television series about children
Animated television series about robots
Animated television series about extraterrestrial life
Anime-influenced Western animated television series